Tilichiki is a rural locality (a selo) and the administrative center of Olyutorsky District of Koryak Okrug of Kamchatka Krai, Russia. It is located on the Korfa Bay of the Kamchatka Peninsula.

History

Tilichiki was established in 1898, and in 1930 it became the administrative center of the district. In April 2006, it was struck by a series of earthquakes which caused substantial damage. The first quake occurred on April 21 and had a moment magnitude of 7.6. This was followed by several aftershocks, and on April 29 a further earth tremor with a magnitude of 6.6 was recorded. This was the strongest earthquake in the region for over a hundred years, and although there were no fatalities, three of the smaller localities were completely destroyed.

Geography and climate
Tilichiki lies in the northeast of the Kamchatka Peninsula, west of the Olyutor Range, on the shores of the Skrytaya Harbor, separated by a narrow spit from the northern part of the Korfa Bay in the Bering Sea.

Korf and Tilichiki have a subarctic climate (Köppen Dfc) though owing to their maritime location the winters are not so severe as at the same latitude in interior Siberia. As an illustration, the mean temperature of the coldest month is approximately  higher than in Olyokminsk at the same latitude near the Pole of Cold. Precipitation also shows the pronounced maritime influence, with annual averages being typical of Kamchatka and around three or four times those of interior Siberia at the same latitude. The heavier snow cover and milder winter temperatures mean that in spite of the mean temperature of the warmest month not reaching beyond , permafrost is only discontinuous. Strong winds, however, limit tree growth severely. Due to the cool ocean moderating winds from the interior, neither  nor  have been measured, with the area having a much lower thermal oscillation than typical for the Russian Far East.

Economy and infrastructure
Industries include fishing and potato and vegetable farming, sometimes in greenhouses.

Transportation
The Tilichiki Airport is located to the south of Tilichiki, and it is also connected by ferry service to the port of Korf.

References

Notes

Sources

Rural localities in Kamchatka Krai
Ports and harbours of the Russian Pacific Coast
Populated coastal places in Russia
Populated places established in 1898
1898 establishments in the Russian Empire
Road-inaccessible communities of Russia